Nicholas Suban (born 9 May 1990) is a former professional Australian rules footballer who played for the Fremantle Football Club in the Australian Football League.

Originally from Bacchus Marsh, Victoria and of Slovenian origin, Suban captained both the North Ballarat Rebels in the TAC Cup and Victoria Country in the 2008 AFL Under 18 Championships.  He was named in both the Under 18 All-Australian Team and the TAC Cup Team of the Year in both 2007 and 2008. Suban was drafted by Fremantle with the 24th selection in the 2008 AFL Draft.

Suban is only the second player to wear the number 8 guernsey for Fremantle, following the retirement of inaugural squad member Shaun McManus in 2008.  Along with fellow new recruit Stephen Hill, Suban made his debut in the opening round of the 2009 AFL season, and both played all 22 games for the season.  In Round 21, Suban was one of Fremantle's best players in their 54-point win over Essendon.  His career-high 25 possession and two goal game earnt him an AFL Rising Star nomination.

In April 2010, Suban extended his contract until the end of the 2012 season.  After playing 25 consecutive games from his debut in 2009, Suban missed his first game in Round 4 of the 2010 season due to an ankle injury suffered in the final minutes of Fremantle's win over Geelong at Subiaco Oval.  He returned in round 9 and played 13 more games for the year.  In round 4 of the 2011 season against  at Subiaco Oval, Suban fractured his right fibula when his leg was trapped under teammate Ryan Crowley.  He missed over three months of football before returning to play in the Western Derby in Round 18.

Suban had a disappointing 2012 season, being tried in a variety of positions in his 14 games, often as the substitute player.  In 2013, however, he moved to play more in the midfield, and played in 22 games, including the 2013 AFL Grand Final.  He played his 100th game for Fremantle in a surprise loss to bottom placed St Kilda in round 18 of the 2014 season.

He was delisted by Fremantle at the conclusion of the 2017 season.

Statistics
 Statistics are correct to the end of the 2016 season

|-
|- style="background-color: #EAEAEA"
! scope="row" style="text-align:center" | 2009
|style="text-align:center;"|
| 8 || 22 || 10 || 12 || 191 || 84 || 275 || 56 || 65 || 0.4 || 0.6 || 8.7 || 3.8 || 12.5 || 2.6 || 3.0
|-
! scope="row" style="text-align:center" | 2010
|style="text-align:center;"|
| 8 || 16 || 3 || 3 || 139 || 71 || 210 || 40 || 67 || 0.2 || 0.2 || 8.7 || 4.4 || 13.1 || 2.5 || 4.2
|- style="background-color: #EAEAEA"
! scope="row" style="text-align:center" | 2011
|style="text-align:center;"|
| 8 || 10 || 2 || 2 || 93 || 40 || 133 || 22 || 33 || 0.2 || 0.2 || 9.3 || 4.0 || 13.3 || 2.2 || 3.3
|-
! scope="row" style="text-align:center" | 2012
|style="text-align:center;"|
| 8 || 14 || 3 || 2 || 111 || 38 || 149 || 26 || 38 || 0.2 || 0.1 || 7.9 || 2.7 || 10.6 || 1.9 || 2.7
|- style="background-color: #EAEAEA"
! scope="row" style="text-align:center" | 2013
|style="text-align:center;"|
| 8 || 22 || 16 || 11 || 223 || 106 || 329 || 67 || 78 || 0.7 || 0.5 || 10.1 || 4.8 || 15.0 || 3.0 || 3.6
|-
! scope="row" style="text-align:center" | 2014
|style="text-align:center;"|
| 8 || 21 || 11 || 9 || 174 || 109 || 283 || 42 || 81 || 0.5 || 0.4 || 8.3 || 5.2 || 13.5 || 2.0 || 3.9
|- style="background-color: #EAEAEA"
! scope="row" style="text-align:center" | 2015
|style="text-align:center;"|
| 8 || 24 || 7 || 14 || 231 || 103 || 334 || 51 || 93 || 0.3 || 0.6 || 9.6 || 4.3 || 13.9 || 2.1 || 3.9
|-
! scope="row" style="text-align:center" | 2016
|style="text-align:center;"|
| 8 || 15 || 4 || 5 || 113 || 83 || 196 || 27 || 74 || 0.3 || 0.3 || 7.5 || 5.5 || 13.1 || 1.8 || 4.9
|- class="sortbottom"
! colspan=3| Career
! 144
! 56
! 58
! 1275
! 634
! 1909
! 331
! 529
! 0.4
! 0.4
! 8.9
! 4.4
! 13.3
! 2.3
! 3.7
|}

Notes

External links

Nic Suban WAFL statistics

1990 births
Living people
Fremantle Football Club players
Claremont Football Club players
Australian rules footballers from Victoria (Australia)
Greater Western Victoria Rebels players
Peel Thunder Football Club players
People educated at St Patrick's College, Ballarat
South Fremantle Football Club players
Australian people of Slovenian descent